Stanley Raymond Dennison (15 June 1912 – 22 November 1992), an economist, was the third vice-chancellor of the University of Hull.

Dennison was born in North Shields and was educated at Tynemouth Municipal High School, Armstrong College, Newcastle (then part of the University of Durham) and subsequently Trinity College, Cambridge.  From 1935 to 1939 he lectured in economics at the University of Manchester, where he wrote the influential book The Location of Industry and the Depressed Areas (1939). In 1939 he was given a chair as professor of economics at University College Swansea, but shortly after, in 1940, he was appointed chief economic assistant at the War Office. He later worked closely with Harold Wilson, both of whom were assistants to William Beveridge. This work earned Dennison his CBE. At the end of the war he returned to Cambridge as a fellow of Gonville and Caius College. Later he was a professor at Queen's University, Belfast and subsequently David Dale Professor of Economics and pro-vice-chancellor at the University of Newcastle. On the retirement of Sir Brynmor Jones in 1972, Dennison was appointed vice-chancellor of the University of Hull.

Dennison's time at Hull saw a period of retrenchment following earlier expansion of the university. Within a straightened budget he nevertheless expanded subject coverage at the university. However, his relationship with student activists and some staff in a period of heightened political and social unrest on campus was notably abrasive. He never married, and retired in 1979 to his native Tyneside. His academic work was characterised by a liberal economic viewpoint.

References

Bibliography
Bamford, T.W. (1978) The University of Hull: the First Fifty Years, Published for the University of Hull by Oxford University Press.
Obituary - The Times (of London) 24 November 1992.

1912 births
1992 deaths
People associated with the University of Hull
Alumni of Trinity College, Cambridge
English economists
People from North Shields